USS Edorea (SP-549) was a United States Navy patrol vessel in commission from 1917 to 1918.

Edorea was built as the private motor yacht Monaloa by George Lawley & Son at Neponset, Massachusetts in 1909.  She later was renamed Edorea.

In 1917, the U.S. Navy acquired Edorea under a free lease from her owner for use as a section patrol vessel during World War I. She was commissioned as USS Edorea (SP-549) on 27 July 1917.

Assigned to the 4th Naval District, Edorea operated on convoy escort and patrol duties in the Cape May, New Jersey, area for the rest of World War I. She also escorted U.S. Navy submarines to sea for target practice.

Edorea was decommissioned on 10 December 1918 and returned to her owner.

References

Department of the Navy Naval History and Heritage Command Online Library of Selected Images: U.S. Navy Ships USS Edorea (SP-549), 1917–1918. Originally the civilian motor yacht Monaloa (1909), later renamed Edorea
NavSource Online: Section Patrol Craft Photo Archive: Edorea (SP 549)

Patrol vessels of the United States Navy
World War I patrol vessels of the United States
Ships built in Boston
1909 ships
Individual yachts